Sidoine Oussou (born 14 November 1992) is a Beninese former professional footballer who played as a striker. In 2011 and 2012, he made three appearances for the Benin national team.

Club career
After playing club football for Beninese club ASPAC Oussou moved to Europe joining Vålerenga in January 2011. After playing two matches for Vålerenga in the 2011 Norwegian Premier League, his chances in 2012 were limited to the reserve team in the Norwegian Second Division. Oussou was in August 2012 sent on a season-long loan-deal to the Belgium club Cercle Sportif Visé. On 24 July 2013, Oussou signed a one-year loan contract with Kecskeméti TE.

International career
Oussou made his international debut for Benin in 2011.

Career statistics

References

1992 births
Living people
Association football forwards
Beninese footballers
Benin international footballers
ASPAC FC players
Vålerenga Fotball players
C.S. Visé players
Kecskeméti TE players
Naxxar Lions F.C. players
AS Beauvais Oise players
Eliteserien players
Nemzeti Bajnokság I players
Championnat National 2 players
Maltese Premier League players
Beninese expatriate footballers
Beninese expatriate sportspeople in Norway
Beninese expatriate sportspeople in Belgium
Beninese expatriate sportspeople in Hungary
Beninese expatriate sportspeople in France
Expatriate footballers in Norway
Expatriate footballers in Belgium
Expatriate footballers in Hungary
Expatriate footballers in Malta
Expatriate footballers in France
People from Cotonou